Pristurus flavipunctatus, also known as Rüppell's semaphore gecko or Middle Eastern rock gecko , is a species of lizard in the Sphaerodactylidae family found in Ethiopia, Saudi Arabia, Egypt, Djibouti, Somalia, Sudan, Eritrea, and Jordan.

References

Pristurus
Reptiles described in 1835